The Shire of Balonne is a local government area in South West Queensland, Australia, over  from the state capital, Brisbane. It is headquartered in its main town, St George.

History
Kamilaroi (also known as Gamilaroi, Gamilaraay, Comilroy) is an Australian Aboriginal language of South-West Queensland. It is closely related to Yuwaalaraay and Yuwaalayaay. The Kamilaroi language region includes the local government area of the Shire of Balonne, including the towns of Dirranbandi, Thallon, Talwood and Bungunya as well as the border towns of Mungindi and Boomi extending to Moree, Tamworth and Coonabarabran in New South Wales.

Yuwaalaraay  (also known as Yuwalyai, Euahlayi, Yuwaaliyaay, Gamilaraay, Kamilaroi, Yuwaaliyaayi) is an Australian Aboriginal language spoken on Yuwaalaraay country. The Yuwaalaraay language region includes the landscape within the local government boundaries of the Shire of Balonne, including the town of Dirranbandi as well as the border town of Hebel extending to Walgett and Collarenebri in New South Wales.

Yuwaalayaay (also known as Yuwalyai, Euahlayi, Yuwaaliyaay, Gamilaraay, Kamilaroi, Yuwaaliyaayi) is an Australian Aboriginal language spoken on Yuwaalayaay country. It is closely related to the Gamilaraay and Yuwaalaraay languages. The Yuwaalayaay language region includes the landscape within the local government boundaries of the Shire of Balonne, including the town of Dirranbandi as well as the border town of Goodooga extending to Walgett and the Narran Lakes in New South Wales.
Ula Ula Division was created on 11 November 1879 as one of 74 divisions around Queensland under the Divisional Boards Act 1879 with a population of 1271. The name Ula Ula is believed to be derived from an Aboriginal word meaning water lilies, or ripples on water

A separate municipality, the Borough of St George was gazetted on 31 July 1884, but on 13 March 1886 it was abolished and amalgamated back into Ula Ula Division.

On 11 March 1903, Ula Ula Division was renamed Balonne Division, after the Balonne River. The name Balonne is believed to be of Aboriginal origin meaning water or running stream.

With the passage of the Local Authorities Act 1902, Balonne Division became Shire of Balonne on 31 March 1903.

Rivers
The area contains the Balonne, Barwon, Boomi, Culgoa, Little Weir, Maranoa, Moonie, and Narran rivers, which attract fishermen seeking both yellowbelly and Murray cod.

Towns and localities
The Shire of Balonne includes the following settlements:

 St George
 Alton
 Bollon
 Boolba
 Dirranbandi
 Hebel
 Mungindi
 Nindigully
 Thallon

Annual events
Annual events include:
 Fishing competitions
 A golf carnival
 Motorbike endurance rallies
 Country shows and rodeos
 Wool, craft and flower shows

Chairmen and mayors
 1927: David Robert Roberts
 2008–2016: Donna Stewart
 2016: Richard Marsh
2020: Samantha Cathleen O'Toole 

Other notable members of the council include:
 Eddie Beardmore, council member for 15 years and deputy chairman for 8 years, also Member of the Queensland Legislative Assembly for Balonne

Population

Services
Through Rural Libraries Queensland, Balonne Shire Council operates libraries at St George (headquarters), Bollon, Dirranbandi, Hebel and Thallon.

References

Further reading

External links
 
 

 
Local government areas of Queensland
South West Queensland
1879 establishments in Australia